Psichotoe cingulata is a moth in the subfamily Arctiinae. It was described by Sergius G. Kiriakoff in 1963. It is found in Guinea.

References

Moths described in 1963
Arctiinae